"Soprano Home Movies" is the 78th episode
of the HBO television drama series The Sopranos and the 13th episode of the sixth season. It served as the midseason premiere to the second part of Season 6, which HBO broadcast in two parts.

The episode was written by supervising producers Diane Frolov and Andrew Schneider, series creator/executive producer David Chase, and executive producer Matthew Weiner, and it was directed by frequent series director Tim Van Patten. The episode first aired in the United States on April 8, 2007.

Starring
 James Gandolfini as Tony Soprano
 Lorraine Bracco as Dr. Jennifer Melfi *
 Edie Falco as Carmela Soprano
 Michael Imperioli as Christopher Moltisanti
 Dominic Chianese as Corrado Soprano, Jr. *
 Steven Van Zandt as Silvio Dante
 Tony Sirico as Paulie Gualtieri
 Robert Iler as Anthony Soprano, Jr.
 Jamie-Lynn Sigler as Meadow Soprano
 Aida Turturro as Janice Soprano Baccalieri
 Steven R. Schirripa as Bobby Baccalieri
 Vincent Curatola as Johnny "Sack" Sacrimoni**
 Frank Vincent as Phil Leotardo
 Dan Grimaldi as Patsy Parisi
 Gregory Antonacci as Butch DeConcini

* = credit only
** = credited for archive footage

Guest starring

Synopsis
In Brooklyn, a party is held for Phil Leotardo, who has recently returned from the hospital after a long convalescence following his heart attack. Phil tells the Lupertazzi crime family that he is ready to settle down and "enjoy [his] grandchildren."

A flashback two years prior shows Tony Soprano fleeing when Johnny Sack is arrested by the FBI. A teenage boy sees Tony throw a pistol into the snow and retrieves it. In the present, the boy is arrested on a drug charge and the gun is found in his possession, armed with hollow-point bullets. Essex County police ostentatiously arrest Tony on a gun charge based on the boy's testimony. He is briefly jailed but his attorney, Neil Mink, easily secures his release on bail. The gun charge is soon dropped, and no longer hangs over his approaching birthday weekend. The FBI later includes this charge in building a RICO case against Tony.

Tony and Carmela travel to Janice and Bobby's cabin in upstate New York to celebrate Tony's birthday. Tony and Bobby bond as they fire a customized AR-10 assault rifle, Bobby's birthday present to Tony, in the nearby woods. Tony gives Bobby a major new responsibility in the Soprano family and hints at a still higher position. Bobby muses how suddenly and silently death can happen in their lives as gangsters: "You probably don't even hear it when it happens, right?" Tony comments that Bobby has never "popped his cherry" (killed anyone) in contrast with Bobby's father, who according to Tony, was a notorious hit man in his time. Bobby replies that he has come close, but that his father never wanted it for him.

Carmela phones A.J.; he answers the phone, not at the pizzeria where he is now working, but in his parents' bed with Blanca. A group of friends also come for a party.

After dinner, Tony, Carmela, Bobby, and Janice play Monopoly, arguing about house rules, drinking, and joking. Tony is angry with Janice when she tells a story that discredits their father. He makes a crude joke about her in return, apologizes, but then makes another. This provokes Bobby into punching Tony, leading to a messy and ferocious fight. Tony ends up on the floor, bloodied, unable to rise. Panicking, Bobby tries to drive off drunk and backs into a tree; he returns and apologizes. In the morning, Tony and Carmela are persuaded to stay, but Tony fixates on his loss in the fight.

In the afternoon, the women apprehensively watch Tony and Bobby leave, ostensibly for a game of golf. In reality, the two men are meeting with a pair of Québécois. In exchange for a large amount of expired prescription medication at a heavy discount, Tony agrees to a hit on the brother-in-law of one of the Québécois and asks Bobby to personally take care of it. Bobby has to accept. They return to the cabin and Carmela and Tony leave for home. Bobby immediately sets off for Montreal for the hit; he kills the man at point-blank range. He returns to the cabin, picks up his daughter, and hugs her. Back home, Tony watches a "Soprano Home Movies" DVD given to him by Janice as a birthday present: it shows himself and Janice playing together as children.

First appearance
 Faustino "Doc" Santoro: a veteran made man, very likely a capo, of the Lupertazzi crime family, one of the mobsters who welcomes Phil Leotardo back from the hospital.

Deceased
 René LeCours: executed by Bobby Baccalieri in Montreal on orders from Tony Soprano in exchange for $35,000 off the drug prices negotiated with French Canadian gangsters.

Title reference
 Janice's birthday present to Tony is a DVD of old home movies of them and their sister during their childhood.

Production

Writing
"Soprano Home Movies" was written by four of the show's five principal season six writers: supervising producers and writing team Diane Frolov and Andrew Schneider, series creator and showrunner David Chase and executive producer Matthew Weiner, who had been promoted from co-executive producer before the production of "Soprano Home Movies" began. The four developed the episode's story outline along with executive producer
Terence Winter.
"Soprano Home Movies" is Frolov and Schneider's fourth and final official writing credit for the series; it is Chase's twenty-seventh and Weiner's ninth. Chase and Weiner collaborated on two more of the season's episodes: "Kennedy and Heidi" and "The Blue Comet."

Filming
"Soprano Home Movies" was the first episode of the final nine episodes to be produced, following a six-month-long production hiatus, partly due to Gandolfini's knee surgery. In preparation for shooting the episode, series creator/executive producer David Chase held several rehearsals with the lead actors.

The scenes at the lakefront vacation home were filmed over two weeks in June 2006 in Putnam Valley, New York. Additional interior shots were filmed six months later at Silvercup Studios, New York, where a replica of the cabin had been built in a sound stage. The lake seen multiple times in the episode is Lake Oscawana. The scenes of Tony and Bobby fishing were filmed on location on the lake but much closer to the shore than it appears in the episode. The scenes set in Montreal were actually filmed in Clinton Hill, Brooklyn. Filming of the scenes set in New Jersey and the Soprano residence took place on location in Essex County, New Jersey, and in Silvercup Studios.
While filming the cabin fight scene between Tony and Bobby in Silvercup Studios, Steve Schirripa accidentally headbutted James Gandolfini. The fight scene was choreographed but Gandolfini did not step out of the way in time. The real headbutting was kept in the episode.

Cast notes
 Gregory Antonacci, who plays Phil Leotardo's underboss Butch DeConcini on the show, is promoted to the main cast and billed in the opening credits, but only for this episode.
 Dominic Chianese's son Dominic Chianese, Jr. joins the show as a mostly background character, New York mobster Dominic, one of the members of the Lupertazzi crime family who greets Phil upon his return from the hospital.
 The role of Domenica Baccalieri was recast with twins Avery Elaine and Emily Ruth Pulcher replacing Kimberly and Brianna Laughlin.
 Vince Curatola is credited in the opening sequence, although his only appearance in this episode comes in the form of an unused take from the Season 5 episode All Due Respect.

References to previous episodes
 The 2004 winter scene of Johnny "Sack"'s arrest is taken from the season 5 finale "All Due Respect."
 Carmela mentions the house on the shore she and Tony once wanted to buy and Tony, irritated, changes the subject. Carmela refers to Whitecaps, the house on the Jersey Shore featured in the season four finale named after it whose purchase was abandoned immediately after Tony and Carmela's separation.
 Janice describes to Carmela her previous boyfriend who once hit her and she "exploded" in anger against him, referring to the murder of Richie Aprile in the season two episode "The Knight in White Satin Armor."
 Carmela mentions to Janice on the lake that Tony slapped A.J. and added that he "felt horrible after it for days" in the season three finale "Army of One."

Other cultural and historical references
 Doc Santoro sings the opening line from "The Girl from Ipanema" when he sees Phil Leotardo at his party.
 When Tony sees Bobby wearing shorts and a sleeveless shirt at the lake house, Tony exclaims "National Lampoon's Vacation!" in reference to the 1983 movie starring Chevy Chase.
 When Janice tells Tony he has changed and is "different" since the shooting, Tony responds: "Different how? How am I different?" a homage to Joe Pesci's character Tommy DeVito in the famous Goodfellas scene: "Funny how? How am I Funny?"
 Monopoly'''s distributors, the Parker Brothers, are mentioned by Bobby when he disagrees with digressing from the game's official rules.
 Casualties of the Iraq War are mentioned in a radio broadcast.

Music
 The song "Trouble in Paradise" by The Crests is played at Phil Leotardo's party.
 The song "Funk #49” by the James Gang is played on Tony's car radio as he and Carmela drive to the cabin.
 The songs "Love Hurts" covered by Nazareth and "Out of Time" by The Rolling Stones are played during the karaoke scene at the cabin.
 The songs "Killer Joe" by The Rocky Fellers and "Take Five" by The Dave Brubeck Quartet plays in the background as the two couples play Monopoly.
 Tony teases Bobby and Janice by singing a parody of "Under the Boardwalk" by The Drifters.
 The song played over the end credits is "This Magic Moment", also by The Drifters. The song's chorus is heard briefly during the episode Tony is sitting at the lakeside and Bobby is tuning a radio on the veranda.

Reception

Ratings
"Soprano Home Movies" drew an average of 7.66 million viewers when it first aired on HBO on Sunday, April 8, 2007, in the United States. This estimate was done by Nielsen Ratings. This was a significant drop from the 2006 season premiere episode, "Members Only", which attracted 9.47 million viewers and the lowest ratings for a Sopranos premiere since the season two opening episode, "Guy Walks Into a Psychiatrist's Office...", which drew roughly the same number of viewers as "Soprano Home Movies" (7.64 million viewers).

Critical response
The episode was critically acclaimed. Tom Biro of television webblog TV Squad gave the episode a favorable review, writing "All in all, big thumbs up from me."
Marisa Carroll of PopMatters called the midseason premiere "stellar" and wrote that "David Chase repeatedly re-imagines ordinary family scenarios—like a weekend trip to the mountains—in brutal, gangster terms. [...] Such signature exaggerations remain both hilarious and unsettling." She awarded the episode a score of 9 out of 10 (shared with the following two episodes).
Tim Goodman of the San Francisco Chronicle praised the episode, writing "the series remains as vital and interesting as ever [...] There may be no better (or realistic) way to go forward into this Sopranos swan song."
Kim Reed of Television Without Pity gave the midseason premiere an A−, writing "...while, on the surface, not much happened, I think there were a ton of callbacks to previous episodes and that familiar Soprano tension was used to good effect."
Maureen Ryan of the Chicago Tribune wrote "this is loose, contemplative Sopranos storytelling at its best."
Lisa Schwarzbaum of Entertainment Weekly was impressed with the midseason premiere and wrote that, despite not being a very eventful episode on the surface, "everything happened".
Alan Sepinwall of The Star Ledger gave "Soprano Home Movies" a positive review and praised it for featuring the character of Bobby Bacala in a more prominent role, writing "The hour was largely a refresher course on Tony, Janice and their history, but it also gave Bacala the dignity he's so often been deprived by the writers."
Alessandra Stanley of The New York Times gave the episode a mixed review, calling it "solemn" and wrote that "even before last season the series had started to sag in places, a creative fatigue that matched the main characters' weariness and also the audience's."
Brian Zoromski of IGN awarded "Soprano Home Movies" a score of 9.5 out of 10, citing the calm, subtle storytelling as a great strength.

Awards
In 2007, "Soprano Home Movies" was nominated in four categories for the 59th Primetime Emmy Awards. The episode was submitted for consideration in the category of Outstanding Drama Series. This led to a nomination and the show—which was judged by six episodes from the second part of the sixth season, including "Soprano Home Movies"—won.
It was also nominated but failed to win in the categories of Outstanding Cinematography for a Single-Camera Series (Phil Abraham), Outstanding Single-Camera Picture Editing for a Drama Series (William B. Stich), and Outstanding Supporting Actress in a Drama Series (Aida Turturro).
The episode was also submitted for Emmy consideration in the categories of Outstanding Supporting Actor in a Drama Series (Steve Schirripa) and Outstanding Writing for a Drama Series (David Chase, Diane Frolov, Andrew Schneider, and Matthew Weiner); however, it was not nominated.
In 2008, Tim Van Patten was nominated for the Directors Guild of America Award for Outstanding Directing – Drama Series, but lost out to Mad Men's Alan Taylor, also a director for The Sopranos'', who happened to win the Emmy Award for directing "Kennedy and Heidi" at the 59th Primetime Emmy Awards.

References

External links
"Soprano Home Movies"  at HBO

The Sopranos (season 6) episodes
2007 American television episodes
Television episodes written by David Chase
Television episodes directed by Tim Van Patten